Homer is the name given to the purported author of the Ancient Greek poems the Iliad and the Odyssey.

Homer can also refer to:

Places
In the United States:
 Homer, Alaska, a city
 Homer, Georgia, a town
 Homer, Illinois, a village
 Homer, Indiana, an unincorporated community
 Homer, Iowa, an unincorporated community
 Homer, Kansas, an unincorporated area
 Homer, Louisiana, a town
 Homer, Michigan, a village
 Homer, Minnesota, an unincorporated community
 Homer, Nebraska, a village
 Homer, New York, a town
 Homer (village), New York
 Homer, Ohio, an unincorporated community
 Homer, Union County, Ohio, a ghost town
 Homer, Texas, an unincorporated community
 Homer, Wisconsin, an unincorporated community
 Homer Township (disambiguation)

In England:
Homer, Shropshire, a village

In outer space:
 Homer (crater), on Mercury

Sports
 Homer (sports slang), a myopic fan or media coverage biased toward the home team
 Home run, a term in baseball for when the batter touches all the bases and scores on the same play.

Other uses
 Homer Simpson, the main protagonist in the animated television series The Simpsons
 Homer (Ezekiel), a sculpture by Moses Jacob Ezekiel at the University of Virginia, US
 Homer (film), a 1970 drama film
 Homer (name), a list of people and fictional characters with the given name or surname
 Homer (software), an IRC client for Macintosh computers during the 1990s
 Homer (unit), a unit of volume
 Homer (brand) an independent, American, luxury brand, founded in 2018 
 Homer High School (disambiguation)
 HOMER1, or Homer homolog 1 (Drosophila), a human gene
 Homing beacon (or "homer"), a type of tracking transmitter
 Mil Mi-12, NATO reporting name Homer, a Soviet helicopter
 Prince Homer, a small truck produced by Prince Motor Company and later by Nissan
 Racing Homer, a type of racing pigeon
 SS Homer a steamer scuttled during the American Civil War

See also
Homer City, Pennsylvania
Homeric (disambiguation)
Homerus (disambiguation)
Omero, the Italian version of the given name Homer